Collateral is the debut studio album by the Australian twin duo NERVO. It was released by Ultra Records on 24 July 2015.

Track listing

Charts

Release history

References 

2015 debut albums
Nervo (DJs) albums
Ultra Records albums